Eagle Brook Church is a Baptist Evangelical multi-site megachurch based in Centerville, Minnesota. It is affiliated with Converge. Weekly church attendance was 25,340 people in 2022. The senior pastor is Jason Strand.

History
The church was founded in 1948 as a house Bible study group called the First Baptist Church led by Sam and Ethel Hane in White Bear Lake, Minnesota.  In 1991 Bob Merritt became the senior pastor of the 300-member church.  In 1995, the church was renamed Eagle Brook Church.  In 2005, it inaugurated a new building at Lino Lakes, Minnesota, with a café, a bookstore and a 2,100 seat auditorium.  As of 2019, it had opened 8 campuses in different cities in the Minneapolis-Saint Paul area.  In 2020, Jason Strand became the senior pastor of the church.  According to a church census released in 2020, it claimed a weekly attendance of 25,340 people and 9 campuses in different cities.

Beliefs 
The Church has a Baptist confession of faith and is a member of Converge.

See also
 List of the largest evangelical churches
 List of the largest evangelical church auditoriums
 Worship service (evangelicalism)

References and notes

External links

Baptist churches in Minnesota
Evangelical megachurches in the United States
Baptist multisite churches